is a co-educational private university in Shizuoka city, Shizuoka Prefecture Japan.

History
The Shizuoka Eiwa Girls’ School was founded in 1887 by missionaries from the Methodist Church of Canada with the support of the Shizuoka prefectural government, and continues to be affiliated with the Methodist church. It was the first institution in Shizuoka Prefecture to offer secondary education for girls.

A two-year Shizuoka Eiwa College was established in 1966. A third year program in English language and Japanese literature was added in 1992, which became a four-year coeducational university in 2002. Today over 1400 students are enrolled in two- and four-year programs.

Academic Programmes

Four year programmes
Department Humanities and Social Sciences
Psychology
Literature
Culture and Tourism
International Inter-Disciplinary Studies
Department of Community and Social Welfare
Education
Social Welfare
Two year programmes
Department of Contemporary Communications
Business management
Tourism
Health care
Department of Food Science
Food and Nutrition

External links
 

Educational institutions established in 1887
Private universities and colleges in Japan
Universities and colleges in Shizuoka Prefecture
Buildings and structures in Shizuoka (city)
1887 establishments in Japan
Christian universities and colleges in Japan